Johan-Sebastian Christiansen (born 10 June 1998) is a Norwegian chess player. He was awarded the titles International Master, in 2015, and Grandmaster, in 2018, by FIDE.

Chess career
Christiansen achieved the norms required for the title of Grandmaster in the 2017 European Team Chess Championship in Hersonissos, in Pardubice in July 2018 and in Gothenburg in August 2018.

In 2022, Christiansen won the 1st Colonia de Sant Jordi Chess Festival on a tie-break with Brandon Clarke, with a score of 7.5/9

References

External links 
 
 Johan-Sebastian Christiansen team chess record at Olimpbase.org

https://chess24.com/en/read/news/carlsen-karjakin-as-new-in-chess-classic-starts-saturday

1998 births
Living people
Norwegian chess players
Chess grandmasters
Place of birth missing (living people)